2011 UEFA Women's U-19 Championship First Qualifying Round will be the first round of qualifications for the Final Tournament of 2011 UEFA Women's Under-19 Championship. They will be played in September 2010. 44 teams are split into 11 groups of 4 and teams in each group play each other once. Italy received byes to the final as host.  The top two teams in each group and the best third-placed team entered the 2011 UEFA Women's U-19 Championship Second qualifying round to join Germany.

Groups

Group 1

Group 2 
Azerbaijan withdrew from the competition before playing a game.

Group 3

Group 4

Group 5

Group 6

Group 7

Group 8

Group 9

Group 10

Group 11

Ranking of third-placed teams
In the ranking of the third-place finishers, only the results against the top two teams count. Serbia advanced as the best third-place finisher having been the only team to draw a match against the top two.

References

External links
UEFA.com; official website

1
2011 first
UEFA
2011 in youth sport